This is a list of the governors of the province of Farah, Afghanistan.

Governors of Farah Province

See also
 List of current governors of Afghanistan

Notes

Farah